Fort Matilda railway station lies at the far western edge of the town of Greenock, Scotland. It is a non-staffed station, and is the last stop before the terminus of Gourock railway station on the Inverclyde Line out of Glasgow Central station.

History 
It was closed temporarily between 5 February and 20 April 1973. It closed again in October 1993. The station has continued in use on an unmanned basis, with passengers getting their tickets on the train.

In 2011 the station building was taken over by the Greenock & District Model Railway Club, which obtained necessary approvals and funding from the Railway Heritage Trust and the Stations Community Regeneration Fund for conservation work and improvements to make the building into a clubhouse. Features such as external doors and screens are to be restored to their original appearance, and when completed accommodation will also be made available to other groups as well as use by the model railway club.

Services
From Monday to Saturday, there are 4tph to both Gourock and Glasgow Central. There is a reduced service on Sundays, with only 1tph each way.

References

External links 

 

Railway stations in Greenock
Former Caledonian Railway stations
Railway stations in Great Britain opened in 1889
SPT railway stations
Railway stations served by ScotRail
James Miller railway stations
1889 establishments in Scotland
Listed railway stations in Scotland
Category B listed buildings in Inverclyde